Jorge Comrie (born 7 July 1951) is a Panamanian judoka. He competed in the men's half-heavyweight event at the 1976 Summer Olympics.

References

1951 births
Living people
Panamanian male judoka
Olympic judoka of Panama
Judoka at the 1976 Summer Olympics
Place of birth missing (living people)